Sibling rivalry is a type of competition or animosity among brothers and sisters.

Sibling Rivalry may also refer to:

Music 
 Sibling Rivalry, an album by The Doobie Brothers
 Sibling Rivalry, an album by The Rowans
 Sibling Revelry: The Best of the Smothers Brothers, a compilation album by The Smothers Brothers
 Sibling Rivalry, a music group featuring Joey Ramone

TV and film 
 Sibling Rivalry (film), a 1990 comedy film
 "Sibling Rivalry" (Even Stevens), an episode of Even Stevens
 "Sibling Rivalry" (Family Guy), a 2006 episode of Family Guy

See also 
 Sibling rivalry in animals